The 2008 IIHF Division I World Championship was an ice hockey tournament under the authority of the International Ice Hockey Federation. It was contested from April 13–19, 2008. The tournament was played amongst two separate groups, with the best team in each group, Austria and Hungary, advanced to the top-level championship in 2009. The bottom teams in each group, South Korea and Estonia, were relegated to the lower-level Division II.

Group A's tournament was held in Innsbruck, Austria. The Group B games was hosted by Sapporo, Japan.

Participants

Group A 
Group A was contested in Innsbruck.

Group B 
Group B was contested in Sapporo.

Tournament results

Group A 

 Group A Final standings

Results
All times local.

Group B 

 Group B Final standings 

Results
All times local.

External links 
Group A at the IIHF
Group B at the IIHF

IIHF World Championship Division I
2
2008
2008
Asian
Asian